The Kiss Tour was Kiss' first album support tour. Sometimes known as the First Tour, it also encompassed several shows before and after the "official" dates.

History 
After the first performances, Stanley changed the bandit makeup to the iconic Starchild makeup. Stage props used for this tour were fire engine lights, a drum riser, sparkling drumsticks, Simmons spitting blood and breathing fire, a lighted logo of the band's name, Frehley's smoking guitar and flamethrowers.

When the band was an opening act for Argent on May 2, 1974 in Comstock Park, they were only allowed to perform eight songs as Argent told them the rules, resulting in the headliners shutting off the power to Kiss' equipment when the audience wanted Kiss to perform more songs. Rush opened for Kiss at the Centennial Hall in London, Ontario on July 25 during the tour, which was also John Rutsey's final performance with Rush. The opening act ended up impressing the band so much at that concert that they continued on tour with Rush as the opening act. Kiss took most of August off from the tour to record their follow-up album, Hotter Than Hell.

In the tour program for the band's final tour, Simmons reflected on the tour:

Reception
A reporter from the Winnipeg Free Press who attended the Taché Hall performance in Winnipeg on February 8 which was part of the "Festival of Life and Learning", noted the number of visual effects that notably were smoke bombs, dry ice on the song "Firehouse", as well as the flashing lights and hydraulic lift for the drummer. The reporter however, noted the responses from the audience who were shocked, with others in attendance "sitting on their hands for the majority of the performance".

Setlist
"Deuce"
"Strutter"
"She"
"Firehouse"
"Nothin' to Lose"
"Cold Gin"
"Kissin' Time"
"Let Me Know"
"Acrobat" ("Love Theme from Kiss")
"100,000 Years" (with bass solo and drum solo)
"Black Diamond"
Encore
"Baby, Let Me Go" ("Let Me Go, Rock 'n' Roll")

Tour dates

Personnel
Paul Stanley – vocals, rhythm guitar
Gene Simmons – vocals, bass
Peter Criss – drums, vocals
Ace Frehley – lead guitar, backing vocals

References

Bibliography

Kiss (band) concert tours
1974 concert tours